Robert William Renner  (born October 6, 1954) is a Canadian politician and was a Member of the Legislative Assembly of Alberta for the constituency of Medicine Hat as a Progressive Conservative.

Early life

Renner was born October 6, 1954 in Medicine Hat, Alberta. He graduated from the University of Calgary in 1976 with a Bachelor of Commerce. Before entering provincial politics, Renner owned and operated a family florist business in Medicine Hat.

Political career

Renner was first elected in the 1993 Alberta general election. During his political tenure, Renner has served in numerous capacities; including, member of Treasury Board, Chief Government Caucus Whip, president of the Pacific Northwest Economic Region, chair of the Health Professions Act Implementation Steering Committee, and co-chair of the Automobile Insurance Implementation Team.

Renner was Minister of Alberta Municipal Affairs from 2004 to 2006, during this time he ordered the inspection of the 2004 Calgary municipal election results in Ward 10 on allegations of electoral fraud.

On March 13, 2008, Renner was sworn into his second term as Minister of Alberta Environment, a position that he has held since December 15, 2006. Renner also serves as Deputy Government House Leader, vice-chair of the Cabinet Policy Committee on Resources and the Environment, and as a member of the Agenda and Priorities Committee.

Since becoming Minister of Alberta Environment, Renner has overseen the development of Alberta's 2008 Climate Change Strategy, released in January 2008.  During the Spring 2007 Legislature session, Renner led Bill 3 - The Climate Change and Emissions Management Amendment Act, 2007 - creating the first-ever legislated greenhouse gas emission reduction targets in North America. Renner has also renewed Water for Life, Alberta's water management framework, and he continues to develop the cumulative effects environmental management system.

Personal life

Renner helped champion improvements to the historic downtown Medicine Hat streetscape and is a former president of the Downtown Business Association.  He held the position of Director of the Medicine Hat Chamber of Commerce and was a member of Medicine Hat's Rotary, Freemasonry and Jaycee Clubs.

Election results

References

1954 births
Living people
Members of the Executive Council of Alberta
People from Medicine Hat
Progressive Conservative Association of Alberta MLAs
21st-century Canadian politicians